Conargo Shire was a local government area in the Riverina region in southern New South Wales, Australia.

Localities
The Shire was divided into four wards, and contained six villages - Conargo, Blighty, Mayrung, Pretty Pine, Wanganella and Booroorban.

History
Conargo Shire was established in 1907.  In 2001 the former Windouran Shire was absorbed into Conargo Shire. This amalgamation resulted in an additional  and another 387 residents.

Before mergers in recent decades it was a common in New South Wales for rural shires to have their offices in an adjacent rural municipality (rural town). At the time of its abolition, the only surviving case was Conargo Shire Council's offices in Deniliquin.

Amalgamation

On 12 March 2016, Conargo Shire was abolished and, along with the former Deniliquin Council, the area incorporated into the new Edward River Council.

Council

Composition and election method
The last election for the council was due to be held on 8 September 2012. However, only eight candidates, being the below, nominated for election. There being no additional candidates, the election was uncontested. The makeup of the final council was as follows:

The current Council, elected in 2012, in order of election by ward, is:

References

Local government areas of the Riverina
Former local government areas of New South Wales
1907 establishments in Australia
2016 establishments in Australia